The 10,000 metres speed skating event was part of the speed skating at the 1928 Winter Olympics programme. The competition was held on Tuesday, February 14, 1928.

In this race, Irving Jaffee was leading the competition, having outskated Norwegian defending world champion Bernt Evensen in their heat, when rising temperatures thawed the ice.  In a controversial ruling, the Norwegian referee canceled the entire competition. Although the International Olympic Committee reversed the referee's decision and awarded Jaffee the gold medal, the International Skating Union later overruled the IOC and restored the ruling. Evensen, for his part, publicly said that Jaffee should be awarded the gold medal, but that never happened.

Medalists

No medals were awarded as the competition was abandoned.

Records
These were the standing world and Olympic records (in minutes) prior to the 1928 Winter Olympics.

(*) The record was set in a high altitude venue (more than 1000 metres above sea level) and on naturally frozen ice.

Results

Heats
Heat 1

Heat 2

Heat 3

Heat 4

Heat 5

This heat was abandoned after 2000 metres due to thawing ice.

Standings after four heats

References

Official Olympic Report
 

Speed skating at the 1928 Winter Olympics